Veguru is a village located in Nellore District of Andhra Pradesh, on the east coast of India.

References

Villages in Nellore district